October is the second album by English singer-songwriter Claire Hamill, released in 1973. Hamill has identified the subject of the track "Speedbreaker" as being John Martyn with whom she had an affair.

Track listing 
All tracks composed by Claire Hamill; except where indicated
 "Island" (Steve Smith) - 3:21
 "To the Stars" - 2:03
 "Please Stay Tonight" - 3:02
 "Wall to Wall Carpeting" - 2:22
 "Speedbreaker" -  3:12
 "I Don't Get Any Older" (Mike Coles, Hamill) - 2:32
 "Warrior of the Water" - 2:56
 "The Artist" - 2:39
 "Baby What's Wrong (With You)" (Jimmy Reed) - 4:30
 "Sidney Gorgeous" - 1:56
 "Crying Under the Bedclothes" - 3:37
 "Peaceful" - 2:19

Personnel 
Claire Hamill - vocals, guitar, piano
Tim Smith, Wayne Perkins - guitar, vocals
Pat Donaldson - electric bass
Chris Laurence - bass
Steve Smith - keyboards, vocals
Jean Roussel - piano
Alan White - drums, percussion
Gerry Conway - drums
Henry Spinetti - congas
Nick Harrison - string arrangements
Paul Samwell-Smith, Claire Hamill - song arrangements
Technical
Barry Hammond, Simon Heyworth - engineer
John B. McCoy, Tony Dimitriades - coordination
Patrick Lichfield - photography

References

External links
Claire Hamill's website

Claire Hamill albums
1973 albums
Albums produced by Paul Samwell-Smith
Island Records albums
Albums recorded at Morgan Sound Studios